James C. Clarken (19 July 1876 – 31 July 1953) was a rugby union player who represented Australia.

Clarken, a prop, was born in Thames, New Zealand and claimed a total of 4 international rugby caps for Australia His debut game was against New Zealand, at Dunedin, on 2 September 1905.

Clarken and Harald Baker (brother of R. L. "Snowy" Baker) are remembered for their heroic rescues in the Coogee surf disaster of 28 January 1911.

See also
 1912 Australia rugby union tour of Canada and the U.S.

References

1876 births
1953 deaths
Australia international rugby union players
Australian rugby union players
Rugby union players from Thames, New Zealand
Rugby union props
New Zealand emigrants to Australia